Feliciano is a Spanish, Portuguese, and Italian name. Notable people with the name include:

Given name
Feliciano Belmonte Jr. (born 1936), Filipino politician
Feliciano Centurión (born 1962), Paraguayan painter
Feliciano Leviste (1898-1972), Filipino politician
Feliciano López (born 1981), Spanish tennis player
Feliciano Magro (born 1979), Swiss footballer
Feliciano Perducca (1901–1976), Argentine footballer
Feliciano Rivilla (born 1936), former Spanish footballer
Feliciano de Silva (1491–1554), Spanish writer
Feliciano Viera (1872-1927), Uruguayan politician

Middle name
António Feliciano de Castilho (1800–1875), Portuguese writer
Cinézio Feliciano Peçanha (born 1960), Brazilian musician
Edson Feliciano Sitta (born 1983), Brazilian footballer

Surname
Cheo Feliciano (1935-2014), Puerto Rican composer and singer of salsa and bolero music
Felice Feliciano (1433-1479), Italian calligrapher and composer
Francisco Feliciano (born 1941), Filipino composer and conductor
Héctor Feliciano (born 1952), Puerto Rican author
Jesús Feliciano (born 1979), Puerto Rican baseball player for the New York Mets
José Feliciano (born 1945), Puerto Rican singer and guitarist
Marco Feliciano (born 1972), Brazilian politician and pastor
Mario Feliciano (born 1998), Puerto Rican baseball player
Michael Feliciano (born 1983), American drag queen also known as Roxxxy Andrews 
Pedro Feliciano (1976-2021), Puerto Rican baseball player for the New York Mets

Italian-language surnames
Spanish-language surnames
Portuguese-language surnames
Spanish masculine given names